José Armando Sayovo (born 3 March 1973) is an Angolan Paralympic track and field athlete.

He was the first person to win a Paralympic medal for the Republic of Angola after he won three gold medals, in the 100m, 200m and 400m sprints, at the 2004 Summer Paralympic Games in Athens.

He represented Angola again at the 2008 Summer Paralympics in Beijing, and was his country's flagbearer during the Games' opening ceremony.
 He won three silver medals, in the men's 100m, 200m and 400m sprints.

At the age of 39, he won a bronze medal in the 200m and won a gold medal in the 400m at the 2012 Summer Paralympics in London

Notes

Living people
1973 births
Angolan male sprinters
Visually impaired sprinters
Paralympic athletes of Angola
Paralympic gold medalists for Angola
Paralympic silver medalists for Angola
Paralympic bronze medalists for Angola
Medalists at the 2004 Summer Paralympics
Medalists at the 2008 Summer Paralympics
Medalists at the 2012 Summer Paralympics
Athletes (track and field) at the 2004 Summer Paralympics
Athletes (track and field) at the 2008 Summer Paralympics
Athletes (track and field) at the 2012 Summer Paralympics
African Games silver medalists for Angola
African Games medalists in athletics (track and field)
Athletes (track and field) at the 2011 All-Africa Games
Paralympic medalists in athletics (track and field)
Angolan blind people